The Hong Kong Challenge (officially known as the Sun Hung Kai Properties Hong Kong Challenge) was a one-day professional cycling race held annually in Hong Kong since 2017. It was part of UCI Asia Tour in category 1.1.

The race is no longer held in 2018, and replaced with Hammer Hong Kong.

Winners

References

Cycle races in Hong Kong
UCI Asia Tour races
Recurring sporting events established in 2017